James Barbour (1734–1804) was a prominent landowner and member of the Virginia House of Burgesses. This James Barbour Jr. was the son of the former Sarah Todd and James Barbour (1707–1775) who patented land in Spotsylvania County, Virginia in 1731 and 1733, some of which would later be located in Orange County, Virginia and Culpeper County, Virginia after those counties were created. Another of James Barbour Sr.'s sons, Thomas Barbour represented Orange County, Virginia in the Virginia House of Burgesses in 1769 and was the father of James Barbour (18th Governor of Virginia and 11th United States Secretary of War) as well as of Philip P. Barbour (U.S. Congressman from Virginia and an Associate Justice of the United States Supreme Court).

This James Barbour Jr. served in the Virginia House of Burgesses, representing Culpeper County alongside John Field in the assembly of 1761–1765. As an ensign in the Culpeper militia in 1756, under Col. Thomas Slaughter, James Barbour Jr. "marched on an expedition against the Indians above Winchester." In 1775 (the year of his father's death), James Barbour Jr. was county lieutenant of the Culpeper militia, and later served as an officer (colonel) all eight years during the American revolution, raising men and provisions.

After the war, Barbour moved to Garrard County, Kentucky. He died in 1804 near Lancaster, Kentucky.

References

1734 births
1804 deaths
American planters
Barbour family
House of Burgesses members
People from Garrard County, Kentucky
People from Spotsylvania County, Virginia
Virginia colonial people